Sucre Municipality is one of the 18 municipalities (municipios) that makes up the Venezuelan state of Aragua and, according to the 2011 census by the National Institute of Statistics of Venezuela, the municipality has a population of 114,509. The town of Cagua is the shire town of the Sucre Municipality.

Name
The municipality is one of several in Venezuela named "Sucre Municipality" in honour of Venezuelan independence hero Antonio José de Sucre.

History
The town of Cagua was first established as Cagua la Vieja in 1620 and was originally made up of Spaniards.  The origin of the name Cagua, comes from the native word Cahiua, which means snail.  Cagua was rebuilt in its current location in 1622 under the new name of Nuestra Señora del Rosario de Cagua, which was later changed to San Jose de Cagua during the 18th century.  The city is now known as just Cagua.

Cagua is a small city with several squares and has a tropical climate.  It's ones of the most important cities of Aragua because of its proximity to Maracay, the state capital and Caracas.  Cagua has been, for a long time, an important industrial zone.

One of its most important places are Casa Guipuzcoana and the Mountain "El Empalado", where original natives were burned alive by Spanish colonizers; this mountain is rich in marble and typical plants such as Araguaney, Samán, Bucare, and Apamate.

Sites of interest
Sucre square
Casa Guipuzcoana
Marble Mines
Empalado Mountain
Old Mill
Saint Joseph Church
Taiguaiguay Lake

Demographics
The Sucre Municipality, according to a 2007 population estimate by the National Institute of Statistics of Venezuela, has a population of 120,302 (up from 109,723 in 2000). This amounts to 7.2% of the state's population.

Government
The mayor of the Sucre Municipality is Eusebio de la Cruz Agüero, elected on December 8, 2013, with 51,66% of the vote.   He replaced Luis Zambrano shortly after the elections.  The municipality is divided into two parishes; Capital Sucre and Bella Vista.

References

External links
sucre-aragua.gob.ve 

Municipalities of Aragua